Lucilda Hunter, née Caulker (1943 – August 21, 2022) was a Sierra Leonean librarian, novelist and biographer who wrote under the name Yema Lucilda Hunter.

Life
Yema Lucilda Hunter was born in 1943 in Freetown. She was educated at the Annie Walsh Memorial School, before undertaking university study in England. She gained a BA from the University of Reading in 1964, a post-graduate diploma in librarianship from North-Western Polytechnic in 1966, and a master's degree in philosophy from Loughborough University.

Hunter worked as a librarian at the Sierra Leone Library Board, in the Medical Library at Connaught Hospital in Freetown, and with the World Health Organization in Brazzaville. She took early retirement in 1999, and that year was made a fellow of the Library Association. She lived with her husband in Accra, Ghana.

Works

Hunter, Yema Lucilda, 1982.  Road to Freedom.  Ibadan: African Universities Press. (Later reissued in 2016 as Finding Freedom).

Hunter, Yema Lucilda, 1989.  Bittersweet.  London: Macmillan.

Hunter, Yema Lucilda, 2006.  Redemption Song.  Freetown: Sierra Leonean Writers Series.

Hunter, Yema Lucilda, 2012.  Joy Came in the Morning, typewritten pre-publication circulation 

            of Chapter One.

Hunter, Yema Lucilda, 2013.  Joy Came in the Morning. Accra: Sierra Leonean Writers Series.

Hunter, Yema Lucilda, 2014.  Nanna.  Sierra Leonean Writers Series.

Hunter, Yema Lucilda, 2015.  An African Treasure: In Search of Gladys Casely-Hayford.  

            Freetown: Sierra Leonean Writers Series.

Hunter, Yema Lucilda, 2018. Her Name Was Aina.  Freetown: Sierra Leonean Writers Series.

Hunter, Yema Lucilda, 2022.  Deep Waters. Freetown: Sierra Leonean Writers Series.

References

1943 births
2000 deaths
Sierra Leonean librarians
Women librarians
Sierra Leonean novelists
Sierra Leonean women writers
Sierra Leonean people of British descent
Autobiographers
Women autobiographers
Biographers
Women biographers
Sierra Leone Creole people
People of Sierra Leone Creole descent
Farquhar family (Sierra Leone)
Sierra Leoneans of Bahamian descent